Talat Tuncel (born 19 February 1964) is a Turkish football coach and former player who most recently was the manager of the Turkey women's national team.

Career
Tuncel played for various Istanbul-based clubs in the TFF Third League between 1990 and 1994.

In 2007, Tuncel began his coaching career, and between 2008 and 2011, he was responsible for the youth teams of Beşiktaş J.K. in Istanbul. He managed the Turkey girls' U17 team between 2013 and 2014, as well as the Turkey women's U19 team from 2013 to 2014. In November 2014, he took over the Turkey women's U-21 team and Turkey women's national football team from Suat Okyar. After six years of managing the Turkey women's national team, he was replaced by Necla Güngör Kırağası effective January 2020.

Managerial statistics

References

External links

1964 births
Sportspeople from Bursa
Turkish footballers
Turkish football managers
Turkey women's national football team managers
Living people
Association footballers not categorized by position